Pitman's shrew (Crocidura pitmani) is a species of mammal in the family Soricidae. It is endemic to Zambia.

Sources
 Hutterer, R. 2004.  Crocidura pitmani.   2006 IUCN Red List of Threatened Species.   Downloaded on 30 July 2007.

Pitman's shrew
Mammals of Zambia
Endemic fauna of Zambia
Pitman's shrew
Taxonomy articles created by Polbot